Brookula gemmula is a species of sea snail, a marine gastropod mollusk, unassigned in the superfamily Seguenzioidea.

Distribution
This marine species occurs off South Africa.

References

External links
 To World Register of Marine Species

gemmula
Gastropods described in 1932